Indian Giver, the fourth studio album by American bubblegum pop group the 1910 Fruitgum Company, was released in 1969. The title song written by Bobby Bloom, Ritchie Cordell, and Bo Gentry peaked at #5 on the Billboard Hot 100. The song "Special Delivery" went to #38 on the Billboard Hot 100. The album went to 147 on the Billboard 200.

Track listing
All songs written by Mark Gutkowski, Ted Gutkowski, Jerry Kasenetz, Jeffry Katz except where noted.

Charts
Album

Singles

Releases
Album
 BDS-5036

Singles
 "Indian Giver"
 "Special Delivery"

References

1969 albums
1910 Fruitgum Company albums
Buddah Records albums